Siegmund Soicke competed for West Germany in the men's standing volleyball event at the 1988 Summer Paralympics, where he won a gold medal.

He also competed for Germany in men's sitting volleyball events at the 1992 Summer Paralympics (winning a bronze medal), the 1996 Summer Paralympics, the 2000 Summer Paralympics, and the 2004 Summer Paralympics.

See also 
 West Germany at the 1988 Summer Paralympics
 Germany at the 1992 Summer Paralympics
 Germany at the 1996 Summer Paralympics
 Germany at the 2000 Summer Paralympics
 Germany at the 2004 Summer Paralympics

References 

Living people
Year of birth missing (living people)
Place of birth missing (living people)
German men's volleyball players
Paralympic gold medalists for West Germany
Paralympic bronze medalists for Germany
Paralympic medalists in volleyball
Volleyball players at the 1988 Summer Paralympics
Volleyball players at the 1992 Summer Paralympics
Volleyball players at the 1996 Summer Paralympics
Volleyball players at the 2000 Summer Paralympics
Volleyball players at the 2004 Summer Paralympics
Medalists at the 1988 Summer Paralympics
Medalists at the 1992 Summer Paralympics
Paralympic volleyball players of Germany
20th-century German people
21st-century German people